Fertility factor may refer to:
Fertility factor (demography)
Opposites of infertility causes (in medicine)
Fertility factor (bacteria)